Piscicola is a genus of leeches belonging to the family Piscicolidae.

The species of this genus are found in Europe and Northern America.

Species:
 Piscicola annae Bielecki, 1997 
 Piscicola borowieci Bielecki, 1997
 Piscicola geometra

References

Leeches